

Biography
Giovanni Battista Vanni was born in either Pisa or Florence around 1599; he studied successively under Jacopo da Empoli, Aurelio Lomi, and Matteo Rosselli, and then became a disciple of Cristofano Allori. He is better known as an engraver than as a painter. From 1624 to 1632, he lived in Rome, then returning to Florence after visiting Venice.

In 1642, he etched a series of fifteen plates from Correggio's frescoes from the cupola of Parma Cathedral which depict the Assumption of the Virgin (1526–30). He also engraved Paolo Veronese's Marriage at Cana.  His works include  a Triumph of David, now in the palace of the Alberti in Prato,  an Annunciation for the church of San Francesco di Paola in Florence and  a Saint Sebastian Healed at the Feet of the Virgin for the church of San Giovanni dei Fiorentini in Rome. He frescoed a Meal in the house of the Pharisee for a refectory attached to the Church of Santa Maria del Carmine, Florence.

He died at Florence in 1660.

Sources

1590s births
1660 deaths
Italian engravers
17th-century Italian painters
Italian male painters
Painters from Tuscany
Italian Baroque painters